Linda Katherine Albert de Escobar (born 14 August 1940, Columbus, died 15 December 1993, La Mesa), was an American botanist, plant collector, and educator noted for her study of Passiflora as well as her work as a teacher and administrator at the University of Antioquia.  She was director of the university's herbarium from 1981 to 1988, and served as President of the Herbariums Colombian Association.  The species Passiflora linda was named in her honor.  She identified over forty species, mostly in Passiflora.

Education 
Escobar received her undergraduate degree in biology at University of New Hampshire (B.Sc., 1962), her master's from Purdue University (M.Sc., 1971), and her doctorate from the University of Texas at Austin (Ph.D., 1980).  While at Purdue, she studied under the direction of ecologist Alton A. Lindsey.

Selected works

References 

1940 births
1993 deaths
American women botanists
20th-century American botanists
Scientists from Ohio
People from Columbus, Ohio
University of New Hampshire alumni
Purdue University alumni
University of Texas at Austin College of Natural Sciences alumni
Academic staff of the University of Antioquia
American women academics
20th-century American women scientists